Rowarth is a hamlet about 2.5 miles (4 km) north of New Mills in the High Peak borough of Derbyshire, England. It is on the edge of the Peak District, in the hills between New Mills and Marple Bridge, within the parish boundary of New Mills.

The Little Mill Inn in Rowarth is a pub and restaurant in a former candlewick mill, with a waterwheel in the adjacent stream. It has a retired Brighton Belle Pullman railway coach which was once used as dining and guest accommodation.

Geography
The hamlet is only accessible by car on one road, and is most commonly used by walkers who are going to nearby Lantern Pike and Kinder Scout.

The Peak District Boundary Walk runs through the village.

Landmarks
There are several listed buildings in and around Rowarth, all at Grade II, the lowest level of designation, and a couple of scheduled monuments:
the Little Mill Inn, housed in a former mill building dated 1781
Anderton House, dated 1797, and its adjacent barn
Long Lee Farmhouse, dated 1668, and three associated farm buildings
Thornsett Fields Farm, a 17th-century farmhouse, and adjacent barn
an 18th-century barn at Hollins Farm with an earlier doorway dated 1692
Robin Hood's Picking Rods, a wayside and a boundary cross on the border with the neighbouring parish of Chisworth and a nearby cup-and-ring-marked rock

Transport
The Monday to Sunday daytime service 365 runs every hour to the village from Marple, Stockport, and Manchester Airport and an every two hours on a Sunday to Marple, Stockport and Glossop.

References

External links

Hamlets in Derbyshire
Towns and villages of the Peak District
New Mills